Ricardo Enriquez Rotoras (September 18, 1967 – December 2, 2017) was a Filipino educator who served as president of the University of Science and Technology of Southern Philippines (USTP) in Cagayan de Oro, Philippines, since 2006. Rotoras also served 4 terms as president of the Philippine Association of State Universities and Colleges. In December 2017 he was murdered.

Education
Doctor of Engineering, Specialization: Energy Economics and Planning
Graduated in 2002 from the Asian Institute of Technology (AIT) Klong Luang, Pathumthani, 
Thailand.
Post-doctoral studies, Research Fellow at North Carolina State University under the Fulbright-Hays grant.

Career/Accomplishment record after graduation from AIT
          Dean, College of Engineering and Architecture, Mindanao Polytechnic State College (2002-2006)
          Director, Center for Research in Engineering, Mindanao Polytechnic State College (2002-2006)
          President, Mindanao Polytechnic State College (February 2006 – March 2010)
          President, University of Science and Technology of Southern Philippines Formerly Mindanao University of Science and Technology (March 2010 – 2017)
          OIC President (concurrent capacity), Northwestern Mindanao State College of Science and Technology (March 2010 – September 2012)
          President, Mindanao Association of State Colleges and Universities (June 2010-June 2011)
          National President, Philippine Association of State Universities and Colleges (PASUC), July 2011 – 2017
          Vice Chair, National Academe-Industry Council, 2013-2017
          Gamma Kappa Phi 
          Past-President of Rotary Club of Cagayan de Oro Centerpoint (Rotary International District 3870)
          Worshipful Master 2015 of Macajalar Masonic Lodge No. 184 under the jurisdiction of the Most Worshipful Grand Lodge of the Philippines

References

External links
 
 
 
 Globa Peace Foundation 
 Global Peace Convention 2017 Transforming Education 

1967 births
2017 deaths
Filipino educators